Battle of Toulon may refer to:
 Battle of Toulon (1707) during the War of the Spanish Succession
 Battle of Toulon (1744) during the War of the Austrian Succession
 Battle of Toulon (1944), a liberation of the city by French forces following Operation Dragoon

See also
 Siege of Toulon, a 1793 military operation during the French Revolutionary Wars
 Scuttling of the French fleet in Toulon during World War II